New Horizon Institute (Nepali : न्यू होराईजन इन्स्टिच्युट)   was established in year 1989 A.D. (2046 B.S.) which lies in Tilottama Municipality, Rupandehi by a group of educationists, teachers, social workers, and businessman under the leadership of Late Mr. MeLal Chandra Shrestha. It is a successful institution that has produced great intellectuals, scientists and sportsmen. It is a prestigious school in Nepal. This institution has been rewarded with 7 golden shields for best performance in SEE.

History 
The Institute commenced with +2 programmes in management and science streams in 2053 B.S. affiliated with Higher Secondary Education Board. The college initiated Tribhuvan University-affiliated BBS and MBS programmes in 2060 and 2064 BS, respectively. New Horizon College started running Pokhara University-affiliated BBA programmed Under the name of Kshitiz International College in 2009 AD and Butwal Model College, Padsari – 8 Kataiya in 2013. The college is privileged to pioneer introducing Tribhuvan University-affiliated BSc programme in this region from 2068 BS. NHC has launched school level programme in the name of Horizon G.B.S. English Boarding School Under its own management.

Academic programmes

School level education 
 From play groups to Grade 10 at New Horizon English Boarding Secondary School, Kalikangar and Horizon G.B.S.English Boarding School, Tilottama – 5 Drivertole, Rupandehi Nepal

Higher secondary level education 
 +2 Level of education in science and management streams, at New Horizon College +2 complex, Tilottama -5 Drivertole, Rupandehi in the morning and Day Shifts.

University education 
 The BBA and BBA-BI programmes of Pokhara University at Kshitiz International College Complex, Kalikanagar, Rupandehi in the morning and day shifts.
 The BSc, BBS, and MBS programmes of Tribhuvan University, at New Horizon College Complex Butwal Rupandehi in morning and day Shifts.
 The BBA and MPGD  programmes of Pokhara University at Butwal Model College Padsari – 8 Kataiya, Rupandehi in Morning Shift.

References 

Universities and colleges in Nepal
Tribhuvan University
Schools in Nepal
Secondary schools in Nepal
Educational institutions established in 1989
1989 establishments in Nepal